Neil Munro (1947–July 13, 2009) was a Scottish-born Canadian director, actor and playwright.

Acting career
Born in Musselburgh, Scotland, Munro moved to Toronto at an early age. After graduating from the National Theatre School of Canada in 1967, he quickly established himself as one of the most compelling theatre actors in Canada, performing with Toronto Arts Productions, the National Arts Centre (where he played Hamlet, touring the role nationally), the Citadel Theatre, Theatre Calgary, Tarragon Theatre and the Toronto Free Theatre, as well as at the Shaw Festival and the Stratford Festival.

Directing and writing
In 1985, Munro decided to retire permanently from acting for the stage, and to concentrate on directing and playwriting, appearing as an actor only occasionally on film, television and radio.  His most notable appearances include The Jonah Look (which he also wrote), Beethoven Lives Upstairs (as Beethoven), John and the Missus and Dancing in the Dark (1986).  His plays include Bob's Kingdom (Factory Theatre), Extreme Close Up (Toronto Free Theatre, 1980), an acclaimed adaptation of Shakespeare's Hamlet, entitled Hamlet's Room (Theatre Plus, 1991) and, for Shaw Festival in 2005, an adaptation of Georges Feydeau's C'est une femme du monde called Something on the Side.

Shaw Festival
In the early 1990s, Munro was invited by Christopher Newton to become Resident Director at Shaw Festival. For that company he directed many acclaimed and often controversial productions of plays such as Misalliance, The Plough and the Stars, Chaplin (The Trial of Charles Spencer Chaplin, Esq.), Lord of the Flies,  Counsellor-at-Law, Saint Joan, The Front Page, The Petrified Forest, Rashomon, Marsh Hay, The Seagull and all of The Shaw Festival's productions of Granville Barker's plays, including The Voysey Inheritance, The Marrying of Ann Leete, Rococo, Waste, The Secret Life, His Majesty and The Madras House. Munro also directed for most of the major English-language theatres in Canada, including Neptune Theatre, Stratford Festival, Citadel Theatre and Canadian Stage Company.

Awards and achievements
Munro received a Best New Play Dora Award for Bob's Kingdom and a Best Director Dora Award for Hamlet's Room. He was also a Chalmers Award nominee for best new play for Extreme Close Up and, as an actor, has won two ACTRA awards.

Personal life
Munro was married to the actor and painter Carole Galloway, who died in 2000; the couple had no children. Munro died in London, Ontario, after a lengthy struggle with cancer, on July 13, 2009.

Filmography

References

External links

1947 births
2009 deaths
20th-century Canadian dramatists and playwrights
21st-century Canadian dramatists and playwrights
Canadian male stage actors
Canadian theatre directors
Male actors from Toronto
People from Musselburgh
Scottish emigrants to Canada
National Theatre School of Canada alumni
Canadian male dramatists and playwrights
20th-century Canadian male writers
21st-century Canadian male writers